"I Miss You" is a song by British electronic music group Clean Bandit, featuring vocals from American singer and songwriter Julia Michaels. It was written by Michaels, Jack Patterson and Grace Chatto, with production handled by the latter two and Mark Ralph. The song was released to digital retailers on 26 October 2017, as the third single from Clean Bandit's second studio album, What Is Love? (2018).

Background
On 16 October 2017, Clean Bandit first announced the song and its release date on social media, along with the single cover and a pre-order set up on streaming services. Shortly afterwards, Michaels revealed on Twitter that she "wrote ['I Miss You'] at the height of an emotional roller coaster. When I was stuck at the top, this flew out of me." The group posted the first snippet of the song on social media two days later, in which Michaels' layered voice can be heard "singing the melody over a piano piece".

Michaels later confirmed via a tweet that she wrote the song while Jack Patterson was playing the piano. Chatto spoke to Billboard on the meaning behind the track, saying: "It's a simple song, about the unbelievable pain of breaking up with someone you love." She also regarded Justin Bieber's 2015 single "Sorry", a highly successful song co-written by Michaels, as one of her favourites of all time, calling working with Michaels "a real honour".

Critical reception
Allison Stubblebine of Billboard described the song as "packed with the bright symphonic elements synonymous with any Clean Bandit project". Mike Wass of Idolator called it "a sublime banger that packs an emotional punch", praising Clean Bandit for providing "faultless, intricate, multi-layered production", as well as "introducing some Asian sounds into the mix without it sounding forced or gimmicky".

Music video
The self-directed music video, filmed at Ongar heritage railway and the locations on the South Coast in the United Kingdom and a desert in Los Angeles, sees the ensemble, all dressed in red, dancing around, intercut with landscape shots. Chatto described the filming process as "very special". She added: "We got to know each other better in the blazing heat, we experimented with special effects and train tracks." Jack Patterson said that he was "desperately trying to finish [the music video] in time to go on tour".

Credits and personnel
Recording and management
 Recorded at Club Ralph (London, United Kingdom) and Westlake Recording Studios (Los Angeles, California)
 Mixed at Club Ralph (London, United Kingdom)
 Mastered at Metropolis Mastering (London, United Kingdom)
 Published by EMI Music Publishing Ltd and Warner-Tamerlane Publishing Corp. (BMI)/Thanks For The Songs Richard (BMI) administered by Warner-Tamerlane Publishing Corp

Personnel

Julia Michaels – vocals, songwriting
Jack Patterson – songwriting, production, mixing, piano, synthesisers
Grace Chatto – songwriting, production, mixing, cello
Mark Ralph – production, mixing
Keith Gretlein – engineering, vocal engineering
Drew Smith – engineering
Tom AD Fuller – engineering
Rob Cohen – vocal engineering
Luke Patterson – percussion
Stuart Hawkes – mastering

Credits adapted from What Is Love? liner notes.

Charts

Weekly charts

Year-end charts

Certifications

Release history

References

2017 singles
2017 songs
Atlantic Records singles
Clean Bandit songs
Julia Michaels songs
Number-one singles in Israel
Songs written by Jack Patterson (Clean Bandit)
Songs written by Julia Michaels
Songs written by Grace Chatto
Song recordings produced by Mark Ralph (record producer)